Caroline Ann McElnay  is a medical officer in New Zealand. She was the director of public health for the New Zealand Ministry of Health from 2016 to 2022, and chaired the Pandemic Influenza Technical Advisory Group, which advises the Ministry on matters concerning the control of the COVID-19 pandemic in New Zealand.

Biography 
McElnay, one of seven children, grew up on a farm in Bushmills, Northern Ireland.
She studied medicine at Queen's University Belfast and then public health at the University of Manchester. During her studies in Manchester she completed a one-year exchange in New Zealand, including six months in Napier.

She was appointed director of population health for Hawke's Bay District Health Board. She advocated for health equity in the region and in 2014 she published a major report on the subject. While at the board she was involved in the response to Havelock North's gastro outbreak, the first case of the SARS virus in New Zealand and a listeria outbreak.

McElnay was appointed to the role of director of public health at the Ministry of Health in 2016.

McElnay's resignation as director of public health was announced to Ministry of Health staff in February 2022. Her last day in the role was 7 April.

Honours and awards
In the 2023 New Year Honours, McElnay was appointed a Companion of the Queen's Service Order, for services to public health.

Personal life
McElnay later moved with her husband to Napier in 1995. She has three children.

Publications 

 McElnay, C., & University of Manchester. (1991). The epidemiology of hip fractures in the elderly and the efficacy of vitamin D supplementation as a preventive strategy. Manchester: University of Manchester.
McElnay, C., & Hawke's Bay District Health Board,. (2014). Health inequity in Hawke's Bay.

References

Living people
Northern Ireland emigrants to New Zealand
New Zealand public health doctors
Women public health doctors
21st-century New Zealand medical doctors
Year of birth missing (living people)
Companions of the Queen's Service Order
People from County Antrim
Alumni of Queen's University Belfast
Alumni of the University of Manchester